The 2019–20 Segunda División season, also known as LaLiga SmartBank for sponsorship reasons, was the 89th since its establishment.

On 12 March 2020 after most of teams had played 31 games, the league was suspended for at least two weeks due to the COVID-19 pandemic in Spain. The league was suspended indefinitely on 23 March. The season recommenced on 10 June and was initially planned to be completed on 20 July.

On 20 July 2020, the final day of the regular season, Deportivo La Coruña's match against Fuenlabrada was suspended indefinitely due to several Fuenlabrada players testing positive for COVID-19, therefore, delaying the official end of the season. The match was finally played on 7 August, resulting in a 2–1 win for Deportivo.

Teams

Promotion and relegation (pre-season)
A total of 22 teams contested the league, including fifteen sides from the 2018–19 season, three relegated from the 2018–19 La Liga, and four promoted from the 2018–19 Segunda División B. This included the winners of the promotion play-offs.

Teams promoted to La Liga

On 20 May 2019, Osasuna were the first team to be promoted to La Liga, ending a two-year run in Segunda División, following Granada's 1−0 win against Albacete. The second team to earn promotion was Granada after their 1−1 draw against Mallorca on 4 June 2019. This marks an end to a two-year run in the second division. The third and final team to earn promotion to La Liga was play-offs winner Mallorca, after coming back from a 2-goal deficit against Deportivo La Coruña on 23 June 2019. Mallorca left Segunda División only one year after promoting from the Segunda División B and achieving two consecutive promotions.

Teams relegated from La Liga
 
The first team to be relegated from La Liga were Rayo Vallecano. Their relegation was ensured on 5 May 2019, after Real Valladolid beat Athletic Bilbao 1−0, suffering an immediate return to the Segunda Division. The second team to be relegated were Huesca, who were also relegated on 5 May 2019 after a 2−6 home defeat to Valencia, also suffering an immediate return to the second tier. The third and final relegated club were Girona, who concluded their two-year stay in La Liga in a 1−2 away loss at Alavés on 18 May 2019.

Teams relegated to Segunda División B

The first team to be relegated from Segunda División were Reus, expelled on 18 January 2019, due to their failure to pay their players. This ended a three-year spell in Segunda División. The second team to be relegated were Gimnàstic, who were relegated on 5 May 2019 after Albacete drew 0−0 against Numancia, ending a four-year run in the second division. The third relegated club was Córdoba, in a 0−1 away loss at Las Palmas on 12 May 2019. They ended a 12-year-spell in professional football in Spain, with one of those seasons in La Liga. The fourth and final relegated team was Rayo Majadahonda in a 3–4 away loss at Oviedo with a last-minute goal on 4 June 2019. Rayo returns to Segunda División B after a one-year stay in Segunda.

Teams promoted from Segunda División B

The first two teams to achieve promotion were Racing Santander and Fuenlabrada on 2 June 2019 after defeating Atlético Baleares and Recreativo on aggregate in the play-off semi-finals respectively. Racing Santander returned to the Segunda División after a four-year absence. Fuenlabrada went on to become Segunda División B champions as well as making its first-ever appearance in the Spanish second tier. The third team to clinch promotion to the Segunda División was Ponferradina on 29 June 2019, after defeating Hércules in the non-champions play-offs; they returned after a three-year absence from the Segunda División. The fourth and final team to get promoted was Mirandés on 30 June 201, after also coming out victorious in the non-champions play-offs, this time against Atlético Baleares; Mirandés returned after a two-year absence from the Segunda División.

Stadia and locations

Personnel and sponsorship

Managerial changes

League table

Results

Positions by round

The table lists the positions of teams after each week of matches. In order to preserve chronological evolvements, any postponed matches are not included to the round at which they were originally scheduled, but added to the full round they were played immediately afterwards. The league suspension due to COVID-19 happened after most teams had played 31 matches.

Season statistics

Top goalscorers

Top assists

Zamora Trophy

The Zamora Trophy was awarded by newspaper Marca to the goalkeeper with the lowest goals-to-games ratio. A goalkeeper had to have played at least 28 games of 60 or more minutes to be eligible for the trophy.

Hat-tricks

Note
(H) – Home ; (A) – Away

Discipline

Player
 Most yellow cards: 17
  Mickaël Malsa (Mirandés)
 Most red cards: 3
  Sergio Tejera (Oviedo)

Team
 Most yellow cards: 137
 Albacete
 Most red cards: 12
 Cádiz
 Fewest yellow cards: 87
 Extremadura
 Fewest red cards: 2
 Elche

Match ball 
On 15 April 2019, Puma announced their official partnership with Segunda División to manufacture the official match ball for the Liga de Fútbol Profesional. This ended Segunda División's 23-year partnership with Nike.

Average attendances 
Attendances do not include games played behind closed doors.

LFP Awards

Monthly

Number of teams by autonomous community

References

 
2019-20
Spain
2
Segunda División